Vladimir Grigoryevich Yegorov (26 November 1938 – 8 June 2022) was the governor of Kaliningrad Oblast of Russia from 2001 to 2005. He was Admiral commanding the Baltic Fleet before he became governor. He was born in Moscow in 1938.

Naval service

Yegorov was born in Moscow in 1938, after completing high school he worked as a lathe operator in a factory in Leningrad before entering the M.V. Frunze Higher Naval School. Yegorov graduated with the gold medal in 1962 and joined the Northern Fleet. In 1964 he transferred to the Baltic Fleet and was torpedo officer on a destroyer. He completed the higher officers course in 1971 and commanded the Krivak-class frigate Bditelnyy and the Kashin-class destroyer Obraztsovyy. Between 1974 and 1984 Yegorov commanded squadrons of destroyers and a flotilla of missile boats of the Baltic Fleet. In 1984 he completed the General Staff Academy and was subsequently base commander of the Baltiysk Naval Base and then commander of the Soviet Mediterranean squadron. Yegorov was promoted to Admiral and commanded the Baltic Fleet from 1991.

Politics
Yegorov was elected Governor of the Kaliningrad Oblast in November 2000, defeating incumbent Governor Leonid Gorbenko in the gubernatorial election. Yegorov's candidacy was supported by Russian President Vladimir Putin. He retired from office in 2005.

Yegorov was seriously injured in a car accident on 7 May 2009.

Yegorov was an honorary citizen of Kaliningrad and an honorary member of the Swedish Royal Marine Society. He was also an honorary member of the Saint Petersburg Maritime Council and the Society of Military Attaches.

Honours and awards
 Order of Merit for the Fatherland, 3rd class
 Order of Military Merit
 Order for Service to the Homeland in the Armed Forces of the USSR, 2nd class and 3rd class
 Jubilee Medal "300 Years of the Russian Navy"
 Jubilee Medal "In Commemoration of the 100th Anniversary since the Birth of Vladimir Il'ich Lenin"
 Jubilee Medal "Twenty Years of Victory in the Great Patriotic War 1941-1945"
 Jubilee Medal "50 Years of the Armed Forces of the USSR"
 Jubilee Medal "60 Years of the Armed Forces of the USSR"
 Jubilee Medal "70 Years of the Armed Forces of the USSR"
 Medal "For Impeccable Service", 1st, 2nd and 3rd class

References

1938 births
2022 deaths
Russian admirals
Governors of Kaliningrad Oblast
Military personnel from Moscow
Recipients of the Order "For Merit to the Fatherland", 3rd class
Recipients of the Order of Military Merit (Russia)
Recipients of the Order "For Service to the Homeland in the Armed Forces of the USSR", 2nd class
Recipients of the Order "For Service to the Homeland in the Armed Forces of the USSR", 3rd class
Baltic Fleet
Soviet admirals